Crimora multidigitalis is a species of sea slug, a nudibranch, a shell-less marine gastropod mollusc in the family Polyceridae.

Distribution 
This species was described from Point Danger, Torquay, Victoria, Australia. It has subsequently been reported from Queensland, New South Wales and Tasmania in depths of 0 – 55 metres. It has also been found at the Poor Knights Islands, New Zealand.

References

External links 
 Chuk, J. (2003) Crimora multidigitalis. Nudibranchs - A photographic atlas for the Bass Strait region.

Polyceridae
Gastropods described in 1957